Cryptophragmus is an extinct genus of sponges in the extinct family Aulaceratidae. Species are from the Ordovician of Australia, Canada (Ontario), China and the United States (Georgia, Virginia).

See also 
 List of prehistoric sponge genera

References 

 The Rise, Development and Extinction of Stromatoporoids. Deyuan Dong, Palaeontologia Cathayana, pages 267–268,

External links 
 
 

Prehistoric sponge genera
Stromatoporoidea
Ordovician animals
Paleozoic life of Ontario